Roger Victor LaFrançois (born August 2, 1956 in Norwich, Connecticut) is an American former professional baseball player. He spent the entire  season on Boston's MLB roster, but played infrequently as a third-string catcher behind Gary Allenson and Rich Gedman.

Career
LaFrançois attended Eastern Connecticut State University, the University of Connecticut and the University of Oklahoma. In 1975 and 1976, he played collegiate summer baseball with the Orleans Cardinals of the Cape Cod Baseball League (CCBL), and was named a league all-star in 1976. He was selected by the Red Sox in the eighth round of the 1977 MLB draft and spent five seasons in their farm system before his 1982 promotion.

In his eight-game MLB career, LaFrançois was a .400 hitter (4-for-10) with four hits one RBI, one run, one double, and a .500 slugging percentage. He started one game at catcher, the final regular season contest on October 3, 1982, against the New York Yankees at Yankee Stadium. LaFrançois went two-for-five, scoring the decisive run as the Red Sox won, 5–3, in 11 innings.

LaFrançois played two more seasons in the minor leagues before retiring as an active player. Since, he has been a manager in the Montreal Expos' farm system and a batting instructor at the minor-league level for several organizations, as well as for the independent league Worcester Tornadoes. In 1986, he returned to the CCBL as catching and pitching coach for the Harwich Mariners.

As of 2016, LaFrançois was serving as the hitting coach for the State College Spikes of the New York–Penn League, Short Season–A affiliate of the St. Louis Cardinals.

References

Further reading

External links
 , or Retrosheet

1956 births
Living people
Anchorage Glacier Pilots players
Baseball coaches from Connecticut
Baseball players from Connecticut
Boston Red Sox players
Bristol Red Sox players
Brooklyn Cyclones coaches
Cape Cod Baseball League coaches
Durham Bulls players
Elmira Pioneers players
Major League Baseball catchers
Minor league baseball coaches
Minor league baseball managers
Orleans Firebirds players
Pawtucket Red Sox players
Richmond Braves players
Sportspeople from Norwich, Connecticut
Winston-Salem Red Sox players